Aephnidiogenes is a genus of trematodes in the family Aephnidiogenidae.

Species
Aephnidiogenes barbarus Nicoll, 1915
Aephnidiogenes major Yamaguti, 1934
Aephnidiogenes senegalensis Dollfus & Capron, 1958

References

Aephnidiogenidae
Trematode genera